Sucre is the capital of Bolivia, the capital of the Chuquisaca Department and the sixth most populous city in Bolivia. This relatively high altitude gives the city a subtropical highland climate with cool temperatures year-round.

Its pre-Columbian name was Chuquisaca; during the Spanish Empire it was called La Plata. Before the arrival of the Spanish, the city of Chuquisaca had its own autonomy with respect to the Inca Empire (the Charcas were the only people that did not pay the ransom for the Inca captive). Today, the region is of predominantly Quechua background, with some Aymara communities and influences.

Today Sucre remains a city of major national importance and is an educational and government center, as well as the location of the Bolivian Supreme Court. Its pleasant climate and low crime rates have made the city popular amongst foreigners and Bolivians alike. Notably, Sucre contains one of the best preserved Hispanic colonial and republican historic city centres in the Western Hemisphere - similar to cities such as Cuzco and Quito. This architectural heritage and the millenarian history of the Charcas region has led to Sucre's designation as a UNESCO World Heritage Site.

Sucre has held an important place in Bolivian history from its place as an important center in the Real Audencia de Charcas, and later as the first capital of Bolivia before the fall of silver's importance as a global mineral commodity. Some regional tension remains from the historical transfer of capital functions to La Paz, and even today the issue features an important role in local culture and political ideology.

Today Sucre is well known for its role in national judicial functions, its local culture and history, renowned architectural urban fabric, and local industries such as chocolate, textiles, and concrete.

History
On November 30, 1538, Sucre was founded under the name Ciudad de la Plata de la Nueva Toledo (City of Silver of New Toledo) by Pedro Anzures, Marqués de Campo Redondo. In 1559, the Spanish King Philip II established the Audiencia de Charcas in La Plata with authority over an area which covers what is now Paraguay, southeastern Peru, northern Chile and Argentina, and much of Bolivia. The Real Audiencia of Charcas was a subdivision of the Viceroyalty of Peru until 1776, when it was transferred to the newly created Viceroyalty of the Río de la Plata. In 1601 the Recoleta Monastery was founded by the Franciscans and in 1609 an archbishopric was founded in the city. In 1624 St Francis Xavier University of Chuquisaca was founded.

Very much a Spanish city during the colonial era, the narrow streets of the city centre are organised in a grid, reflecting the Andalusian culture that is embodied in the architecture of the city's great houses and numerous convents and churches. Sucre remains the seat of the Roman Catholic Church in Bolivia, and a common sight is members of religious orders dressed in traditional habit. For much of its colonial history, Sucre's temperate climate was preferred by the Spanish royalty and wealthy families involved in silver trade coming from Potosí. Testament to this is the Glorieta Castle. Sucre's University (Universidad Mayor Real y Pontificia de San Francisco Xavier de Chuquisaca) is one of the oldest universities in the new world.

On May 25, 1809, the Bolivian independence movement was started with the ringing of the bell of the Basilica of Saint Francisco. This bell was rung to the point of breakage, but it can still be found in the Basilica today: it is one of the most precious relics of the city.
Until the 19th century, La Plata was the judicial, religious and cultural centre of the region. It was proclaimed provisional capital of the newly independent Alto Peru (later, Bolivia) in July 1826. On July 12, 1839, President José Miguel de Velasco proclaimed a law naming the city as the capital of Bolivia, and renaming it in honor of the revolutionary leader Antonio José de Sucre. After the economic decline of Potosí and its silver industry, the Bolivian seat of government was moved from Sucre to La Paz in 1898. Many  argue Sucre was the location of the beginning of the Latin American independence movement against Spain. The first "Grito Libertario" (Shout for Freedom) in any Western Hemisphere Spanish colony is said to have taken place in Sucre in 1809. From that point of view, Bolivia was the last Spanish imperial territory in South America to gain its independence, in 1825. In 1991 Sucre became a UNESCO World Heritage Site.

The city attracts thousands of tourists every year due to its well-preserved downtown with buildings from the 18th and 19th centuries. Nestled at the foot of the twin hills of Churuquella and Sika Sika, Sucre is the gateway to numerous small villages that date from the colonial era, the most well-known of which is Tarabuco, home of the colorful "Pujllay" festival held each March. Most of these villagers are members of one of the indigenous ethnicities. Many dress in clothing distinctive to their respective villages.

Government
Together with La Paz, Sucre is one of two governmental centers of Bolivia: It is the seat of the judiciary, where the Supreme Court of Justice is located. As designated in the Constitution of Bolivia, Sucre is the true capital of the nation, while La Paz is the seat of government. Sucre is also the capital city of the department of Chuquisaca.

The government of the City of Sucre is divided into executive and legislative branches. The Mayor of Sucre is the executive head of the city government, elected for a term of five years by general election. The legislative branch consists of the Municipal Council, which elects a President, Vice President and Secretary from a group of eleven members.

The mayor of Sucre is Enrique Leaño of the Movement for Socialism, who defeated Horacio Poppe in elections held on March 3, 2021.

The Municipal Council is the legislative branch of the government of the municipality of Sucre, the constitutional capital of Bolivia. The council consists of eleven elected members, and it elects its own President, Vice President and Secretary. The members of the municipal council elected on May 3, 2021 are:

Oscar Sandy (MAS)
Yolanda Barrios (MAS)
Rodolfo Avilés (MAS)
Guadalupe Fernández (MAS)
Eduardo Lora (R-2025)
Melisa Cortés (R-2025)
Antonio Pino (R-2025)
Carmen Rosa Torres (R-2025)
Jenny Montaño (C-A)
Gonzalo Pallares (CST)
Edwin González (Unidos)

Geography and territorial organization

Sucre is divided into eight numbered districts: the first five of these are urban districts, while Districts 6, 7, and 8 are rural districts. Each is administered by a Sub-Mayor, appointed by the Mayor of Sucre. The rural districts include numerous rural communities outside the urban area.

Climate
Sucre has a subtropical highland climate (Köppen: Cwb), with mild temperatures year round. Rain generally falls in summer thunderstorms.

The highest record temperature was   while the lowest record temperature was 

The City of Four Names

Each of the well known names represent a specific era of the city's history.Charcas was the indigenous name for the place upon which the Spaniards built the colonial city.La Plata was the name given to the emerging Hispanic city of privilege and honor.
The name Chuquisaca was bestowed upon the city during the independence era.Sucre'' honors the great marshal of the Battle of Ayacucho (December 9, 1824), Antonio José de Sucre.
"La Ciudad Blanca" is a nickname that was bestowed upon the city because many of the colonial style houses and structures are painted white.

Sports
Sucre has the most important sport facilities in Bolivia, and the most practiced sport in the city is football. Sucre has the second-biggest football and Olympic stadium in the country, the Estadio Patria. As of the 2019 Apertura, the 2008 champion club Universitario de Sucre was relegated from the Bolivian professional league, leaving the city without a first-division team.

Other sports are also practiced, such as swimming at la Piscina Bolivariana, basketball at numerous courts around the city, as well as taekwondo, kung fu, volleyball, tennis and racquetball.

Education

Sucre is home to the second oldest public university in the Americas, the Universidad Mayor Real y Pontificia de San Francisco Xavier de Chuquisaca; often abbreviated USFX. The university draws students both nationally and internationally, and different departments can be found scattered around the city. Degree areas at USFX include law, political science, medicine, odontology, chemistry, business administration, financial sciences, and more.

The city also features other academic institutions such as a campus of the private university Universidad Privada del Valle also known as Univalle, the National Teachers School (Escuela Nacional de Maestros "Mariscal Sucre"), the Universidad Privada Domingo Savio, and the Universidad Andina Simón Bolívar.

Architecture
The city of Sucre contains many old and classic buildings.

The House of Freedom 

Built in 1621, it is perhaps the most important building of the nation. The republic was founded in this building by Simón Bolívar who wrote the Bolivian Constitution.
The "Salón de la Independencia" houses the Bolivian Declaration of Independence.

National Library
Built on the same year of the foundation of the Republic, it is the first and the most important historical, bibliographical and documentation center of the country. The National Library has documents that date from 16th century.

Metropolitan Cathedral

Built between 1559 and 1712, the cathedral has the "Museo Catedraliceo" which is the first and most important religious museum of the country. The "Pinacoteca" has a vast collection of paintings by Colonial and Republican masters and also by Europeans such as Bitti, Fourchaudt and Van Dyck. The Cathedral contains a vast amount of jewelry made of gold, silver and gemstones.

Archbishop's Palace
Built in 1609, was an important religious and historic institution during colonial times.

Departmental Autonomous Government of Chuquisaca

One of the best buildings of republican architecture, this was completed in 1896. It was the first Palace of Government of Bolivia but when the government was moved to La Paz it became the Chuquisaca Governorship Palace.

Supreme Court of Justice
On July 16, 1827, the Supreme Court of the Nation was established. Its first president was Dr. Manuel Maria Urcullo. Others prominent in its history include Dr. Pantaleon Dalence, who was twice president of the Supreme Court and through his qualities became known as the 'Father of Bolivian Justice'. This institution was installed in several places before moving to its current building. It was designed in the neoclassical style under the canons of French academicism and was inaugurated on May 25, 1945.

General Cemetery
Some of the areas date from the late nineteenth century. Ornate mausoleums, tombs and gardens with magnificent old trees populate the space that is home to the graves of important people in the arts, sciences and the history both of Bolivia and of Latin America. Because of the tranquility offered by the site, many students choose to study here.

Churches and Convents

San Felipe Nery
San Francisco
La Recoleta
Santa Teresa
Santa Clara
Santo Domingo
San Lazaro (The oldest church in the country and ex-Cathedral of Sucre)
San Sebastian
Iglesia de la Merced
San Agustín
Santa Mónica
Santa Barbara
San Miguel

Chapels
Loreto's Chapel
Virgen de Guadalupe

Transportation
The city is served by Alcantarí Airport with multiple domestic destinations on three commercial airlines.

Twin towns – sister cities
 La Plata, Argentina
 San Miguel de Tucumán, Argentina
 Ushuaia, Argentina
 Concepción, Chile

See also
Antonio José de Sucre
Charca people
La Paz

References

External links

UNESCO World Heritage Site

 
Capitals in South America
World Heritage Sites in Bolivia
Populated places established in 1538
Populated places in Chuquisaca Department
1538 establishments in the Spanish Empire
1538 establishments in South America